Christophe Bettally (18th century – 19th century) was a scientific instrument maker.

Maker of scientific instruments, probably of Italian descent, whose name was Anglicized. Active between 1787 and c. 1807 in London, where he had shops in Oxford Street and Pimlico, and Paris. Produced thermometers, barometers, hygrometers, and glass instruments for physics experiments, according to his trade cards in the Banks Collection at the British Museum.

References

British scientific instrument makers
18th-century British businesspeople
19th-century British businesspeople
Year of birth missing
Year of death missing